Harel is both a surname and a given name. Notable people with the name include:

Surname
 Alon Harel (1957-), Israeli law professor
 Dan Harel (1955-), general in the Israeli Defense Force
 David Harel (1950-), computer sciences professor
 Eden Harel (1976-), Israeli actress and TV host
 Idit Harel Caperton (1957-), Israeli psychologist and epistemologist
 Isser Harel (1912-2003), Israeli spymaster
 Louise Harel (1946-), Canadian politician
 Philippe Harel (1956-), French film director, actor and screenwriter
 Rachel (Roos-Hertz) Harel, member of the Dutch Resistance
 Yitzhak Harel (1957-), general in the Israeli Defense Force
 Yossi Harel (1918-2008), Israeli captain, member of the Israel intelligence community

Given name
 Harel Levy (born 1978), Israeli professional tennis player
 Harel Locker, Israeli lawyer and civil servant
 Harel Moyal (born 1981), Israeli singer, songwriter and stage actor
 Harel Skaat (born 1981), Israeli singer
 Harel Srugo, Israeli tennis player

See also
 Harel Brigade, Israeli army brigade. One of four formed out of the Palmach in 1948
 Harel Group, an insurance and financial services company in Israel
 Harel, Israel, a kibbutz in Israel
 20279 Harel, an asteroid

Hebrew masculine given names
Hebrew-language surnames